Yury Iosifovich Puntus (born 8 October 1960) is a Soviet football player and a Belarusian football coach. He quit playing football in 1987 because of an injury. Puntus graduated from two universities: Belarusian Technological Institute (specialty – mechanical engineer) in 1983 and Belarusian State University of Physical Training in 1996.

Managerial career
After working for a few seasons in Russian and Belarusian lower leagues' clubs, in 1996 Puntus was appointed as a head coach for newly reformed BATE Borisov. Puntus led the team to the Belarusian Premier League in just two seasons and eventually won two championship titles (in 1999 and 2002).

In 2004 Puntus joined MTZ-RIPO Minsk and led the team to winning Belarusian Cup in 2005. In January 2006 he was appointed as Belarus national football team head coach and later that year he left MTZ-RIPO to focus on national team's UEFA Euro 2008 qualifying campaign. In late 2007 he was sacked due to unsatisfying results and immediately rejoined MTZ-RIPO, before leading them to another Cup title in 2008.

In the following years Puntus coached Dinamo Brest (from 2009 to 2011), Smolevichi-STI (from 2011 to 2013), whom he led to the promotion from Second League to First League, and Slavia Mozyr, whom he joined in early 2014.

Honours
As Coach

BATE Borisov
Belarusian Premier League champion: 1999, 2002

MTZ-RIPO Minsk
Belarusian Cup winner: 2004–05, 2007–08

References

1960 births
Living people
Soviet footballers
Belarusian footballers
Association football forwards
Belarusian expatriate footballers
Expatriate footballers in Russia
FC Traktor Minsk players
FC Granit Mikashevichi players
FC Baranovichi players
FC Spartak Semey players
FC Yugra Nizhnevartovsk players
Soviet football managers
Belarusian football managers
Belarusian expatriate football managers
Expatriate football managers in Russia
FC BATE Borisov managers
FC Partizan Minsk managers
Belarus national football team managers
FC Dynamo Brest managers
FC Smolevichi managers
FC Slavia Mozyr managers
FC Belshina Bobruisk managers
FC Torpedo Zhodino managers
FC Naftan Novopolotsk managers